Janus van Kasteren Jr. (born 10 September 1986) is a Dutch rally driver and businessman. He is the owner of Boss Machinery company, a heavy machinery supplier based out of Veldhoven. van Kasteren is best known for his participation in rally raid events in rally trucks. He is the winner of the 2023 Dakar Rally in the trucks category. In 2023, van Kasteren began participating in the World Rally-Raid Championship.

Dakar Rally results

References

Living people
1986 births
Dutch rally drivers
Dakar Rally drivers
Dakar Rally winning drivers
Rally raid truck drivers
Off-road racing drivers